A list of films produced in the United Kingdom in 1966 (see 1966 in film):

1966

See also
1966 in British music
1966 in British radio
1966 in British television
1966 in the United Kingdom

References

External links

1966
Films
British